String Quartet No. 19 may refer to:

 String Quartet No. 19 (Mozart), Dissonance by Wolfgang Amadeus Mozart
 String Quartet No. 19 (Spohr) by Louis Spohr